Kristine Nøstmo (born 8 June 1993) is a retired Norwegian football goalkeeper who spent almost her entire career in Toppserien side Rosenborg.

She played junior football for Hommelvik IL and senior football for Malvik IL before joining SK Trondheims-Ørn in 2012. The team changed its name to Rosenborg in 2020.

She made her debut for the Norway women's national football team in the 2017 Algarve Cup, keeping a clean sheet against Portugal. In 2018 she retired from international play, citing several comments made by national team officials about body weight.

References

1993 births
Living people
People from Malvik
Norwegian women's footballers
SK Trondheims-Ørn players
Rosenborg BK Kvinner players
Toppserien players
Norway women's youth international footballers
Norway women's international footballers
Women's association football goalkeepers
Sportspeople from Trøndelag